Florabel Muir (May 6, 1889 – April 27, 1970) was an American reporter, newspaper columnist and author. She became known for covering both Hollywood celebrities and underworld gangsters from the 1920s through the 1960s.

Career
Muir was born in the mining town of Rock Springs, Wyoming. She attended the University of Washington in Seattle, where she worked as the assistant editor of a student paper. After graduation, she briefly worked as a teacher before quitting to pursue a career as a newspaper reporter. She began her professional newspaper career at The Salt Lake Herald after convincing the city editor to break with tradition and hire their first female reporter. Eventually, she moved to The Salt Lake Tribune where she was, again, their first female reporter. After brief stints at other papers, she went to work for the New York Daily News as a police reporter in 1927.

In 1934, she attempted to quit her newspaper career and become a fiction writer. However, she received and accepted an offer from the New York Post. Later, she and her husband left for Hollywood after receiving an offer to write screenplays at Fox. She is credited with one screenplay, Fighting Youth (1935), produced by Universal Studios.

She went back to the Daily News as their Los Angeles correspondent when her former editor was having trouble covering a story in Hollywood. While still writing for the Daily News, she also contributed stories to the Saturday Evening Post, The Los Angeles Mirror, and began writing a column, Just for Variety, for Daily Variety. She also hosted programs on radio and television (KFI).

Muir was injured during a shooting attempt on the life of mobster Mickey Cohen at Sherry's restaurant on the Sunset Strip at 3:55 a.m. on July 20, 1949. Cohen was struck in the shoulder. Three others were also wounded, including Cohen henchman "Neddie" Herbert, who later died from his wounds. Muir was struck in the backside when a slug ricocheted and left a large bruise. Her first instinct was to call the Mirror and get a photographer to the scene while her husband screamed for her to get down.
She was also a confidant of Cohen and enlisted her husband to improve Cohen's reading and vocabulary skills.

In 1950, she released her memoirs, Headline Happy.

Personal life
Muir was married to The Saturday Evening Post writer Denis A. "Denny" Morrison. The couple had no children and remained married until Morrison's death on September 24, 1966.

Death
Muir died in Los Angeles on April 27, 1970 at the age of 80. She was interred next to her husband at the Holy Cross Cemetery in Culver City.

Works

References

Further reading

External links

1889 births
1970 deaths
20th-century American women writers
20th-century American journalists
20th-century American memoirists
American women short story writers
American short story writers
Burials at Holy Cross Cemetery, Culver City
New York Daily News people
American gossip columnists
American women columnists
New York Post people
Variety (magazine) people
People from Rock Springs, Wyoming
The Salt Lake Tribune people
University of Washington alumni
American women memoirists
American women screenwriters
Journalists from California
Journalists from Wyoming
20th-century short story writers
The Daily of the University of Washington alumni
20th-century screenwriters